is an autobahn in Germany. It connects the A 3 and A 6, passing cities such  as Rüsselsheim and Darmstadt.

Exit list 

 

 

 

 

|}

External links 

67
A067